The San Angelo Formation is a geologic formation in Texas. It preserves fossils dating back to the Permian period. It is one of the geologically youngest formations to preserve fossils of pelycosaurs.

Stratigraphy and age

The San Angelo Formation belongs to the Kungurian stage of the Cisuralian series. It underlies the Blaine Formation, which is either upper Kungurian or lower Guadalupian.

Fossil content
Everett C. Olson regarded the San Angelo Formation as preserving some of the oldest known therapsids, several of which he classified in a taxon he called Eotheriodonta. These taxa are now interpreted as caseids and sphenacodontids, not therapsids.

Synapsids

See also

 List of fossiliferous stratigraphic units in Texas
 Paleontology in Texas

References

Bibliography

Permian geology of Texas